Danielle Lee Hollis (born 10 May 1985) is a former Australian cricketer who is a right-handed batter. Born in Tamworth, New South Wales, she represented Queensland in 47 List A matches in the Women's National Cricket League (WNCL) between the 2004–05 and 2014–15 seasons. She also made 40 appearances for Queensland in the Australian Women's Twenty20 Cup.

References

External links
 
 

1985 births
Living people
Australian cricketers
Australian women cricketers
Cricketers from New South Wales
People from Tamworth, New South Wales
Sportswomen from New South Wales
Queensland Fire cricketers